Best of Nollywood Awards (stylised as BON Awards) is an annual film event presented by Best of Nollywood Magazine, honouring outstanding achievement in the Nigerian Movie Industry. The first edition was held on 6 December 2009, in Ikeja, Lagos State. The 2013 ceremony honouring movies of 2013, was held at Dome, Asaba, Delta State on 5 December 2013. Governor Emmanuel Uduaghan was the chief host, and the nomination party was held at the State House in Lagos. The red carpet used for the event was aimed to be one of the longest in history.

Ceremonies 
 2009 Best of Nollywood Awards
 2010 Best of Nollywood Awards
 2011 Best of Nollywood Awards
 2012 Best of Nollywood Awards
 2013 Best of Nollywood Awards
 2014 Best of Nollywood Awards
 2015 Best of Nollywood Awards
 2016 Best of Nollywood Awards
 2017 Best of Nollywood Awards
 2018 Best of Nollywood Awards
 2019 Best of Nollywood Awards
 2020 Best of Nollywood Awards
 2021 Best of Nollywood Awards

Categories 
As of 2013, the BON Awards have approximately 35 categories.

 Best Lead Actor in an English Movie
 Best Lead Actress in an English Movie
 Best Lead Actor in a Yoruba film
 Best Lead Actress in a Yoruba film
 Best Supporting Actor in an English film
 Best Supporting Actress in an English film
 Best Supporting Actor in a Yoruba film
 Best Supporting Actress in a Yoruba film
 Most Promising Act of the Year (male)
 Most Promising Act of the Year (female)
 Best Child Actor (male)
 Best Child Actor (female)
 Comedy of the Year
 Movie with the Best Social Message
 Best Kiss in a Movie
 Best Makeup in a Movie
 Onga Best Use of Nigerian Food in a Movie

 Best Short film of the Year
 Best Use of a Costume in a Movie
 Best Screenplay
 Best Edited Movie
 Best Sound in a Movie
 Best Production Design
 Best Cinematography
 Director of the Year
 Movie of the Year
 Best Special Effects
 Best Actor (Hausa)
 Best Actress (Hausa)
 Best Supporting Actor (Hausa)
 Best Supporting Actress (Hausa)
 Revelation of the Year (Female)
 Revelation of the Year (Male)
 Movie Journalist of the Year
 Marketer of the Year

References 

 
2009 establishments in Nigeria
Nigerian film awards
Awards established in 2009
Entertainment events in Nigeria
Magazine awards